Professor Dato' Dr. Rahmat bin Mohamad is a Malaysian legal scholar and professor of law at the Universiti Teknologi MARA. He is currently the Chairman of the Human Rights Commission of Malaysia (SUHAKAM).

He was the Deputy Vice Chancellor (Industry, Community and Alumni Network) of Universiti Teknologi MARA from November 2018 until November 2021. He has served Universiti Teknologi MARA in Shah Alam in various capacities from 1986 onwards. He served as the Assistant Vice Chancellor (Quality and Knowledge Advancement) (2003–2005), Deputy Vice Chancellor (Research and Innovation) (2005–2008), Assistant Vice Chancellor (Strategy) (2016) and Dean of Law Faculty (2017). He is also currently the Chairman of National Sports Institute of Malaysia. On 23 March 2021, on the recommendation of the Bureau and the candidates proposed by the International Union for Conservation of Nature (IUCN) World Commission on Environmental Law, the IUCN Council appointed Dr Nilufer Oral as the IUCN World Conservation Congress Elections Officer and Dr Rahmat Mohamad as the Deputy Elections Officer.

Career at AALCO
He has served the Asian-African Legal Consultative Organization as the Secretary-General for two terms (2008–2012 and 2012–2016). In recognition of his 8 years contribution at AALCO, in 2016, he was appointed as a member of Eminent Person Group (EPG) of AALCO.

Rahmat was appointed the fifth Secretary- General of the Asian-African Legal Consultative Organization (AALCO) on 20 June 2008 at AALCO's 47th Annual Session held in New Delhi, India. He was subsequently unanimously reappointed on 18 June 2012 at AALCO's 51st Annual Session in Abuja, Nigeria.

Under his supervision, AALCO has also organized various conferences on topics as far-ranging as the Law of the Sea, Climate Change, and Competition Law. He also introduced on the agenda of the Organization subjects of contemporary relevance such as International Law in Cyperspace, Legal Regime governing Marine Biodiversity and Legal Aspects of Violent Extremism and its manifestations. Furthermore, he has delivered academic lectures and addresses at various academic institutions both in India and abroad. In an effort to disseminate knowledge, both on international law in general, as well as on the Asian-African perspective, he has published books and serves as the Editor-in-Chief for several AALCO publications and journals. He has commissioned, through the mandate of AALCO Member States, extensive research studies on topics crucially important to AALCO and its Members; topics have included Unilateral and Secondary Sanctions, Statehood of Palestinian, Cyber-law, and Marine Biodiversity.
Rahmat has been actively involved in the Rome Statue of International Criminal Court (ICC) since 2008 through research publications and organising conferences, workshops and seminars. Among the notable inputs was his intervention in the Putrajaya ICC Dialogue in 2012 prior to the First Review Conference held in Kampala, Uganda in 2012.

Apart from his diplomatic role, he has written on diverse topics in public international law.

Education 
Rahmat Mohamad first read law at Institut Teknologi MARA (now Universiti Teknologi MARA), Malaysia with Diploma in Law and later Advanced Diploma in Law in 1985. He then pursued his postgraduate course and obtained LL.M. in Commercial Law at the University of Bristol, England in 1986. He gained his Doctor of Philosophy in Law from the University of Aberystwyth, Wales in 2001 entitled "Dispute Settlement Mechanism is the ASEAN Free Trade Area (AFTA)".

Capacity as Head of Delegation / Secretary-General of AALCO in the United Nations and Other Inter-Governmental Meetings

During his tenure as Secretary General, he managed to accomplish and attend several diplomatic conferences as Head of Mission- namely in areas of concern to the Member State of AALCO. In particular, at the First Review Conference of the ICC at Kampala, Uganda, and the Informal Meeting between AALCO and the International Law Commission based in Geneva. 

 Address at the General Statement of the Third World Summit of Prosecutors, 23 – 25 March 2009, Bucharest, Romania
Introductory Remarks, Meeting of Legal Advisers AALCO Member States and Joint AALCO- ILC Meeting, 28 October 2009, UN Headquarters, New York
Address at the General Debate of the Review Conference of the ICC Rome Statute, June 2010 Kampala, Uganda
Address at the International Law Commission (ILC), UN Offices in Geneva, 14 July 2010.
Address on Legal Issues Facing the Regions of Africa and Asia in the UN- AALCO Legal Advisers Meeting, November 2010, New York
Address at the Workshop on Trafficking in Persons, Smuggling of Migrants and International Cooperation, November 2010, Putrajaya, Malaysia
Address to the members of International Law Commission (ILC), 2012, Geneva, Switzerland 
General Debate, State Parties Assembly Meeting of the International Criminal Court, The Hague, Netherlands, November 2012
Address on the Selected Work of the International Law Commission (ILC) before the Members of ILC, United Nations, Geneva, July 2014
Head of Delegation/Participants, Intergovernmental Committee on Intellectual Property and Genetic Resources, Traditional Knowledge and Folklore, WIPO Headquarters, Geneva, July 2014
Address on International Law Today: Perspectives and Challenges at the AALCO Legal Advisers Meeting, United Nations Trusteeship Council Chamber, 24 October 2014, New York
Keynote Address on Marine Bio-Diversity Beyond National Jurisdiction at the AALCO Law of the Sea Expert Meeting with Universiti Malaysia Terengganu, 24–25 August, Putrajaya, Malaysia
Keynote Address on Customary International Law at the AALCO Informal Expert Group Meeting on Customary International Law with the International Law Commission (ILC), Universiti Kebangsaan Malaysia, Bangi, 27 and 28 August 2015
Address on AALCO and UN Diplomacy at 70, AALCO Legal Advisers Meeting, United Nations Trusteeship Council Chambers, 28 November 2015, New York
Chairperson, AALCO –UNODC Talk on Cybercrime and International Law, May 2016, Vienna, Austria

Publications (Books/Book Chapter) 

Rahmat has written numerous articles in journals, newspapers, book chapters, and books in areas of his expertise. 

 Mohamad, R. &  Aziz, A.A., A Dispute Settlement Mechanism for the ASEAN Free Trade Area (AFTA), Lexis Nexis – Malayan Law Journal (2004)
Mohamad, R. &  Aziz, A.A, Understanding Dispute Settlement Mechanisms in the World Trading System: An Analysis of the Mechanism under the WTO, NAFTA and MERCOSUR, Lexis Nexis – Malayan Law Journal Publication (2004)
Mohamad, R, Asian African Perspectives on International Law in the Post Westphalian Era: Some Reflections. AALCO Publication, 2011
Secretary General's Handbook on Basic Entitlements and Obligations under the United Nations Law of the Sea Convention (UNCLOS) (2015)
Mohamad, R, Asian and African Views on International Law (2016): UiTM and KLRCA Joint Publication
Mohamad, R. (2005) “Dispute Settlement Mechanism in the Muslim World”. In International Trade and Finance in Muslim Countries, Kuala Lumpur, IKIM Publication
Mohamad, R & Rizal, A., (2006) “Preservation of Progeny: Issues from the Civil Law Perspectives”, In Genealogy and Preservation of the Progeny: An Islamic perspective, Kuala Lumpur, MPH Publication
Mohamad, R, (2009), “Bringing Together Asian African States in Harmonizing the International Legal Order in the Post Westphalian Era”. In Essays on Contemporary Essays on International Law, New Delhi, AALCO Publication, p. 7
 Mohamad, R, (2011) “Towards a people-centric approach to global governance: Some preliminary reflections”.  In AALCO@50: Some Reflections on International Law, New Delhi, AALCO Publication
Mohamad, R, Rowena Maguire, Bridget Lewis, Charles Sampford ed. (2013) ”The Role of the International Criminal Court and the Rome Statute in International Criminal Justice standard setting: some reflections”. In Shifting Global Powers and International Law: Challenges and Opportunities, London, Routledge, pp 100–115
Mohamad, R, Ali Z. Marossi, Marisa R. Bassett ed. (2014) Unilateral Sanctions in International Law: A Quest for its Legality”. In Economic Sanctions under International Law: Unilateralism, Multilateralism, Legitimacy, and Consequences. The Hague, Springer/ASSER Institute Publication, The Hague, p. 71
Mohamad, R, Ahmad Y, Kikuchi and Popovski ed. (2014), Going Beyond ASEAN Regional Identity. In Building ASEAN Identity on a Transnational Dimension. Tokyo, United Nations University Publication, p. 67
Mohamad, R, (2015) “An Afro-Asian Perspective on the International Criminal Court”. In Historical Origins of International Criminal Law, Volume 4, FICHL Publication Series No. 23, pp729 – 748
Mohamad, R, “International Criminal Court in the Development of international rule of law: a reflection of Asian-African views, Charles Sampford and Ramesh Tahkur eds. (2015). In Institutional Supports for the International Rule of Law, London, Routledge, pp 59 
Mohamad, R, Patrick Keyzer, Vesselin Popovski and Charles Sampford eds. (2015)”The Role of the International Criminal Court in Aiding National Prosecutions of International Crimes”. In Access to International Justice, London, Routledge, pp. 35–46
Mohamad R, Towards a global treaty on conversation and sustainability of marine Biodiversity in areas Beyond National jurisdiction (ABNJ) and Its Implication on ASEAN, in Developments in Malaysian law; Essays Commemorating 50 years of legal Education at UiTM, Sweet and Maxwell, 2018

References 

International law scholars
1960 births
Living people
Academic staff of Universiti Teknologi MARA